Hemja is a former Village Development Committee in the north of Pokhara in Kaski District in the Gandaki Province of northern-central Nepal. In 2014, Hemja was annexed to Pokhara City as ward number 27. Hemja is now under Pokhara Municipality ward #25. At the time of the 2011 Nepal census, it had a population of 12,262 living in 3,019 households.

Education
There are several governmental and private institutions in Hemja, which also has a higher level campus.

Public/Government Colleges and Schools:
 Gauri Shankar Multiple Campus
 Gauri Shankar Higher Secondary School
 Bishnu Paduka Higher Secondary School
 Ambika Higher secondary School
 Gram Prakash Primary School
 Dibya Jyoti Primary School

Private Schools: 
 Dhawalagiri Boarding School
 Hemja Boarding School
 Snow View English Boarding School
 Gyan sagar Academy
 Goodluck montessori
 Balsakha montessori

Communication
There are several Internet Service Providers (ISP) in Hemja. Among them, some are:
 Worldlink 
 Pokhara Internet
 LNT Internet
 Telnet
 NT-fiber

Transportation

Linked with Pokhara-Baglung highway, Hemja offers a regular public bus service from Ghattekhola to Harichowk. People can catch buses across the Kande-Prithvi Chowk route as well.

It also has Deluxe bus facility for different cities, everyday (Day / Night).

Local taxies are available regularly.

Tourism

Being a beautiful town, it  also attracts tourists, specially to the monasteries. Other tourist attractions include bungee jumping, jeep flyer and rafting. There is also the event called Potato Festival yearly.

References

External links
UN map of the municipalities of Kaski District

Populated places in Kaski District